Kipchoge Keino Stadium is a multi-use stadium in Eldoret, Kenya. It is named after the athlete Kipchoge Keino. It holds 10,000 people.

In 2007, the Kenyan Government allocated KSh.100 million/= for the upgrade of the stadium, which had fallen into disrepair.

The stadium has been used by local football teams including Rivatex and Eldoret KCC, but there are currently no teams from Eldoret in the Kenyan Premier League. The stadium is also used for athletics meetings.  The stadium hosted the 2016 Athletics Kenya Olympic Trials.
The stadium is currently being renovated and expanded.

Events

References

External links
Kenya Broadcasting Corporation - Government to upgrade Kipchoge Keino stadium
The East African - on Kenya's stadiums

Sport in Rift Valley Province
Football venues in Kenya
Eldoret
Buildings and structures in Rift Valley Province